Anis Ahmad Kaimkhani (Urdu: انیس قائمخانی born: 5 October) is a Pakistani politician who was the co-founder and president of Pak Sarzameen Party, until its merger into Muttahida Qaumi Movement - Pakistan.

Family and personal life

Early life and education 
Anis Kaimkhani was born on 5 October in Hyderabad, Pakistan where he also received his early education. 

His father was Hidayat Ali Khan who died in December 2012.

Political career

Working with MQM 
Kaimkhani joined MQM in 1985 and rose to the position of unit in charge within two years. Then in 1987 he became the Unit-Incharge. In 1992 he was promoted to the rank of Zonal Incharge Hyderabad. Afterwards he was inducted into party's central co-ordination, Rabita Committee.

Rabita Committee 
In 2011 Altaf Hussain, the chief of the MQM, selected Kaimkhani to be Rabita Committee's deputy convener. The party gave him many responsibilities in 2013 after which he was deducted. He was the former deputy convener of Muttahida Qaumi Movement (MQM). Then he left the party and stayed with Mustafa Kamal out of Pakistan. They stayed there for three years

Comeback and formation of Pak Sarzameen Party 
Anis Kaimkhani, along with Syed Mustafa Kamal, returned to Karachi on 3 March 2016 holding a press conference in a rented house at Khayaban e Sahar in Defence phase 6 Karachi on the same day at 3:00 PM. They both founded a party which was called Pak Sarzameen Party. Kamal became the chairman while Kaimkhani became the president.   

Later on in January 2018, before the 2018 Pakistan general elections, Farooq Sattar invited Kamal and Kaimkhani to rejoin the party but they rejected. Kaimkhani did not contested in the 2018 Pakistan general elections.

References 

Pak Sarzameen Party members
Year of birth missing (living people)
Politicians from Hyderabad, Sindh
Living people

External links 
Anis Kaimkhani on Twitter

Anis Kaimkhani on Facebook